Milnay Louw (born October 6, 1988 in Cape Town, South Africa) is a professional squash player who represents South Africa. She reached a career-high SA ranking of No. 1 in the country, with 3 x South African National titles. With a highest world ranking of No. 60 in March 2014.

References

External links 

Living people
1988 births
South African female squash players
Sportspeople from Cape Town